The 38th Canadian Parliament was in session from October 4, 2004, until November 29, 2005.  The membership was set by the 2004 federal election on June 28, 2004, and it changed only somewhat due to resignations and by-elections, but due to the seat distribution, those few changes significantly affected the distribution of power.  It was dissolved prior to the 2006 election.

It was controlled by a Liberal Party minority under Prime Minister Paul Martin and the 27th Canadian Ministry.  The Official Opposition was the Conservative Party, led by Stephen Harper.

The Speaker was Peter Milliken.  See also List of Canadian federal electoral districts for a list of the ridings in this parliament.

There was one session of the 38th Parliament:

The parliament was dissolved following a vote of non-confidence passed on 28 November by the opposition Conservatives, supported by the New Democratic Party and Bloc Québécois.  Consequently, a federal election was held on 23 January 2006 to choose the next parliament.

Party standings

The party standings as of the election and as of dissolution were as follows:

Bills of the 38th Parliament
Important bills of the 38th parliament included:
Bill C-32 – the Department of Foreign Affairs Act to split DFAIT in two departments, was a surprise defeat for the government
Bill C-38 – the Civil Marriage Act, legalized Same-sex marriage across Canada.
Bill C-43 – the Canadian federal budget, 2005
Bill C-48 – an NDP add-on to the 2005 budget

Complete list of bills

Members

MPs who changed political parties
In early 2005 Ontario Member of Parliament (MP) Belinda Stronach crossed the floor to the Liberal Party after running for Leader of the Conservative Party of Canada, and coming in second to Stephen Harper. She ended her public relationship with Conservative MP Peter MacKay.

Officeholders

Speakers 
Hon. Peter Milliken (the Liberal member for Kingston and the Islands) was re-elected Speaker of the House of Commons of Canada by acclamation on October 4, 2004.
Hon. Daniel Hays (a Liberal Senator for Alberta) was the Speaker of the Senate .

Other Chair occupants 
House of Commons
 Deputy Speaker and Chair of Committees of the Whole – Hon Chuck Strahl (the Conservative Member for Chilliwack-Fraser Canyon).
 Deputy Chair of Committees of the Whole – Marcel Proulx (the Liberal Member for Hull—Aylmer).
 Assistant Deputy Chair of Committees of the Whole – Jean Augustine (the Liberal Member for Etobicoke—Lakeshore).

Senate
 Hon. Shirley Maheu was the Speaker pro tempore of the Senate of Canada, (a Liberal Senator for Quebec).

Leaders
Prime Minister of Canada: Rt. Hon. Paul Martin (Liberal)
Leader of the Opposition: Hon. Stephen Harper (Conservative)
Bloc Québécois leader: Gilles Duceppe
New Democratic Party leader: Hon. Jack Layton

Floor leaders
The following were the parties' floor leaders during the 39th Parliament:

House of Commons
Government House Leader: Hon. Tony Valeri
Opposition House Leader:
Hon. John Douglas Reynolds (to January 27, 2005)
Jay D. Hill (from  January 30, 2005)
Bloc Québécois House leader: Michel Gauthier
New Democratic Party House leader: Libby Davies

Senate
Leader of the Government in the Senate: Hon. Jacob Austin
Leader of the Opposition in the Senate: Hon. Noël Kinsella

Whips
The party whips in this party were as follows:

House of Commons
Chief Government Whip: Hon. Karen Redman
Official Opposition Whip:
Jay D. Hill (to January 27, 2005)
Hon. Robert Douglas Nicholson (from January 28, 2005)
Bloc Québécois Whip: Michel Guimond
New Democratic Party Whip: Yvon Godin

Senate
Government Whip: Hon. Rose-Marie Losier-Cool
Opposition Whip: Hon. Marjory LeBreton

By-elections

See also
 List of Canadian federal electoral districts
 List of Canadian federal parliaments
 38th Canadian House of Commons seating plan

References

External links
 Members of the House of Commons
 Write to Members of Parliament

Succession

 
2004 establishments in Canada
2005 disestablishments in Canada
Paul Martin